Kericho County is one of the 47 counties in Kenya. The county seats between longitude 35°02' and 35°40' East and between the equator and latitude 0°23' South with an altitude of about 2002m above the sea level. It borders Uasin Gishu County to the North West, Baringo County to the North, Nandi County to the North-West, Nakuru County to the East and Bomet County to the South. It has a population of 901,777 (2019 census) and an area of 2,111 km². Its capital and largest town is Kericho.

Kericho County is home to the best of Kenyan Tea which is renowned worldwide for its taste with its town square even known as Chai Square. Some of the largest tea companies including Unilever Kenya, James Finlay and Williamson Tea are based here. It is also home to the popular Ketepa brand.

The defunct Buret District is now part of Kericho County.

Physical and topical features 
County slopes gently from 2500m to about 1,800m above the sea level. The county is surrounded by a number of hills such as Tinderet Hills to the North, Mau Escarpment and Londiani hills (Tuluap-Kipsigis). A good number of rivers emanate from the county including Chemosit, Kiptaret, Kipsonoi, Timbilil, Maramara, Itare, Nyando, Kipchorian and Malaget.

Climatic conditions 
County has a temperature range between 10C - 29C and rainfall of 2,125mm p.a being highest in central part of county where they plant tea and 1,400 mm p.a. in lower parts of Soin and parts of Kipkelion. County has rainy seasons April to June and October to December.

Demographics 
Kericho county has a total population of 901,777 of which 450,741 are males, 451,008 females and 28 intersex persons. There are 206,036 household with an average household size of 4.4 persons per household and a population density 370 people per square kilometre.

Source

Administrative and political units

Administrative units 
There are six sub counties, thirty county assembly wards, eighty five locations and two hundred and nine sub-locations.

Electoral constituencies 
The county has six constituencies:
Ainamoi Constituency
Belgut Constituency
Bureti Constituency
Kipkelion East Constituency
Kipkelion West Constituency
Sigowet–Soin Constituency
Source

Political leadership 

Prof. Paul Kiprono Chepkwony was the Governor serving his last term in office after being elected twice 2013, 2017 and his deputy is Lily Kirui. kiprotich Don/ kirui kiprotich Don is the Senator and was elected in 2015 after the first senator Charles Keter was appointed as the cabinet secretary for Ministry of Energy by President Uhuru Kenyatta. He was also re-elected in 2017. Florence Bore is the women representative and was elected in 2017 after winning against the Hellen Chelangat Chepkwony who was the first women representative for the county.

For Kericho County, the County Executive Committee comprises:-

Source

Members of Parliament in Kericho County 2017-2022 

 Hon. Maritim, Sylvanus of Jubliee Party Member of Parliament Ainamoi Constituency.
 Hon. Koech, Nelson of Jubliee PartyMember of Parliament Belgut Constituency.
 Hon. Mutai, Japheth Kiplangat of Jubliee Party Member of Parliament Bureti Constituency.
 Hon. Limo, Kirui Joseph of Jubliee Party Member of Parliament Kipkelion East Constituency.
 Hon. Kosgei, Hilary Kiplang’at of Jubliee Party Member of Parliament Kipkelion West Constituency
 Hon. Koros, Benard Kipsengeret of Jubliee Party Member of Parliament Sigowet–Soin Constituency.

Education 
There are 1054 ECD centres 803 primary schools and 229 secondary schools. The county has also 1 teachers training colleges, 6 Youth Polytechnics, 80 adult training institutions and 6 technical training institutions. 

Source

Health 
There are a total of 136 health facilities in the county with one county referral hospital. County has 2,084 health personnel of different cadre. The immunisation coverage is at 61% and still below the national target of 90%.

HIV prevalence is at 3.5% below the national 5.9% (Kenya HIV Estimates 2015). 

Source

Transport and communication 
The county is covered by 1,110.7 km of road network. of this 411.1 km is covered by earth surface, 484.7 km is murram surface and 214.9 km is covered by bitumen.

There are 8 Post Offices with 2,299 installed letter boxes, 2,079 rented letter boxes and 220 vacant letter boxes.

Trade and commerce 
There are 25 trading centres, 5,813 registered businesses, 5807 licensed retail traders and 5,740 licensed wholesale traders.

A number of industries are in Kericho such as cement industry (Rai Cement Limited) and steel industry (Prime Steel Limited), Soin Sugar Company all three of them located in Soin ward, 18 tea processing factories, in various sub-counties, dairy processing plants in various sub-counties and Kipkelion District coffee union  process coffee in Fort Ternan, Kipkelion Sub-county .

Services and urbanisation 
 Source: USAid Kenya

See also 
Baringo County
Bomet County
Bungoma County
Kakamega County
Kisii County
Kisumu County
Nakuru County
Nandi County
Uasin Gishu County

References

External links 
 https://www.kericho.go.ke/
 https://www.knbs.or.ke
 https://cog.go.ke
 http://www.parliament.go.ke/the-senate/senators
 http://www.kewopa.org
 https://kura.go.ke/
 https://www.iebc.or.ke
 http://www.klrc.go.kehttps://www.kerra.go.k
 https://nacc.or.ke

 
Counties of Kenya